Marshall Wayne (May 25, 1912 – June 16, 1999) was an American diver who competed in the 1936 Summer Olympics.

In the 1936 Berlin Olympics, he won the gold medal in the 10 meter platform competition as well as the silver medal in the 3 meter springboard event. After the war he was an exhibition diver for Billy Rose's Aquacades. He was the Commanding officer of Lockheed P-38 Lightings in World War II for the 7th Photo Reconnaissance Squadron, and in 1945 he aborted his de Havilland Mosquito plane and landed in Italy.   After the war he was a pilot, navigator and captain for PanAm Airlines. He was inducted into the International Swimming Hall of Fall in 1982, in Ft. Lauderdale, FL.
Born of parents in the Vaudeville troupe that toured the east coast of the US, Marshall began performing at a very young age. Taught by the acrobats of the Vaudeville acts long before he began to dive, Marshall took an interest to tumbling.  When he was a teen at Miami High, he snuck in the Venetian pool in Coral Gables, and his diving career began.  
By the time he was 18, he was diving and performing at the Biltmore Hotel on Miami Beach, entertaining for the socialites and visiting guests.  He won a number of AAU diving awards including first place in the 1934 & 1936 AAU Championships.  He attended two years of college, at the University of Miami, then participated in the 1936 Berlin Olympics, with no international diving experience.  He captured the gold medal in the men’s 10 meter platform, and silver in the 3 meter springboard.  He angered Adolf Hitler as his favorite diver, Hermann Stork was predicted to win.  A heated discussion between the German dictator and Wayne ensued, and was recounted by several family members.  In fact, the US Olympic diving teams (men’s and women’s), won 10 out of 12 possible medals in those games.
After the Olympics Marshall performed for Billy Rose’s Aquacades, with the likes of Esther Williams, Johnny Weissmuller, Buster Crabbe, Eleanor Holm and others.  He then enlisted in the Army Air Corp and became the Commanding Officer of the 7th Photo Reconnaissance Group out of Mt. Farm, England.  Col. Wayne was injured in a flight accident and parachuted out of his plane, only to land in a tree while damaging his leg. He was taken in by an Italian family, and later smuggled out of Italy to England.  After the war he appeared in ads for Camel cigarettes, Havoline motor oil, BVD underwear and others.
Marshall lived his life like he dove---he jumped from the platform with confidence that the water below would break his fall.  If there was a ripple of uncertainty in his life, it was quickly lost in the smooth entry into the unknown.
With his blond hair, tan tall physique and confident style, he was a master of his surroundings.  Marshall was gifted in many ways.  Although his raw talent was diving, his real talent was his high level of intelligence.  Yes, his uncharacteristic good looks got him noticed.  However, his ability to lead others in competition, battle and life were his real strengths.  
Marshall Wayne lived a colorful life, filled with great achievements, service to our country, and celebrity status.

https://www.si.com/more-sports/2015/05/25/memorial-day-dive-bombers-frank-kurtz-marshall-wayne-olympics

External links
profile

 https://www.si.com/more-sports/2015/05/25/memorial-day-dive-bombers-frank-kurtz-marshall-wayne-olympics

1912 births
1999 deaths
Divers at the 1936 Summer Olympics
Olympic gold medalists for the United States in diving
Olympic silver medalists for the United States in diving
American male divers
Medalists at the 1936 Summer Olympics